Son of a Bad Man is a 1949 American Western film directed by Ray Taylor starring Lash LaRue and Al "Fuzzy" St. John. The film was shot at the Iverson Movie Ranch.

Plot
Lash and Fuzzy investigate the masked bandit El Sombre and an Eastern Syndicate buying up land to illegally charge tolls.

Cast
Lash La Rue as Marshal Lash La Rue
Al St. John as Deputy Fuzzy Q. Jones 
Jack Ingram as Rocky
Francis McDonald as Joe Christ
Don C. Harvey as Sheriff Ragle
Frank Lackteen as Piute
Edna Holland as Mrs. Burley

References

External links

1949 films
American Western (genre) films
1949 Western (genre) films
Films directed by Ray Taylor
Lippert Pictures films
American black-and-white films
1940s English-language films
1940s American films